Legoland Malaysia Resort is Malaysia's first international theme park, which opened in Iskandar Puteri, Johor, Malaysia on 15 September 2012 with over 40 interactive rides, shows and attractions. It is the first Legoland theme park in Asia and sixth in the world upon its establishment. The official opening of Legoland Malaysia was made by Sultan Ibrahim Ismail, Sultan of Johor on 22 September.

History

Groundbreaking for the theme park was held on 2 December 2009, hosted by site developer Iskandar Investment Berhad (IIB). Site operator Merlin Entertainments had signed an agreement with IIB to build Legoland Malaysia in December 2008. Merlin signed another agreement with LL Themed Hotel SdnBhd to develop and build the Legoland Hotel in April 2012. 

Besides the Legoland Malaysia theme park, other resort attractions include Legoland Water Park (opened in 2013), which is a Lego-themed water theme park, and The Legoland Hotel (first half of 2014), a Lego-themed hotel, which is also the first to open in Southeast Asia. The hotel was built under a management agreement between the Company and LL Themed Hotel Sdn. Bhd., a joint-venture company owned by Destination Resorts and Hotels Sdn Bhd and Iskandar Harta Holdings Sdn Bhd.

The cost of Legoland Malaysia and the water theme park was RM720 million, while The Legoland Hotel cost RM190 million.

When Legoland Malaysia opened in 2012, it targeted 1.5 million visitors and expected to generate more than RM100 million in the first year of its operation. In September 2017, Legoland Malaysia Resort appointed global digital marketing agency VML to handle all aspects of digital marketing.

According to reports, In November 2017, Legoland Malaysia Resort launched the world's first Lego virtual reality roller coaster.

Layout

Legoland Malaysia is divided into several major areas, each featuring attractions sharing a common theme. Starting from the entrance (themed The Beginning) on the park's eastern edge and proceeding clockwise, they are Technic, Kingdoms, Imagination, Land of Adventure, and City; in the centre of the park is MINILAND. NINJAGO World was added to Land of Adventure in 2016. The Water Park was opened on 21 October 2013, on the park's southeastern edge, as the largest LEGOLAND water park in the world and requires a separate admission fee; the SEA LIFE Malaysia aquarium was officially opened on 28 June 2019 near The Beginning and also requires a separate admission fee.

The Beginning

The Beginning includes the park's welcome sign, admission ticket sales and entrance gates, and several shops specializing in LEGO bricks and sets, LEGO-themed merchandise, and visitor supplies. There are also several restaurants and snack stands in this area.

Technic
The Technic-themed area includes some of the fastest attractions in the park.

Kingdom
The medieval-themed LEGO Kingdom is at the park's southwestern end.

Imagination
The Imagination area includes the Build and Test Centre, where visitors participate in an interactive attraction to build houses, cars, skyscrapers, etc. After building then you can test them out on the earthquake table. The area also includes the Kid Power Towers attraction, a Zierer junior drop tower ride where visitors pull a rope to propel their vehicle seat upward to the top of the tower; once they let go of the rope, they drop down the tower. This area also includes DUPLO-themed attractions for younger visitors.

Land of Adventure
Land of Adventure is designed to evoke the late 1800s and early 1900s, emphasizing the exploration of ancient civilizations by colonial powers.

City
The City area is designed as a miniature town with attractions and rides controlled by children.

Miniland
Each LEGOLAND park contains a Miniland; the one at Malaysia reproduces iconic buildings and areas from Asia on a 1:20 scale. In total, almost 30 million bricks were used over three years for the initial construction of Miniland. Miniland also includes two fictional areas: one themed for pirates, and another themed for Star Wars; the Star Wars exhibit was removed in 2019.

Water Park

Sea Life Aquarium
Sea Life was opened on 29 June 2019 and features more than 25 display tanks in 11 habitat zones. The first admissions to Sea Life were part of a preview weekend held 7–8 May 2019 for season pass holders.

Retired attractions

Roller coasters

Public transportation
Legoland Malaysia Resort is easily accessible by bus and taxi.

See also

 Legoland
 Lego
 2012 in amusement parks
 Lego Technic Test Track
 Lost Kingdom Adventure

References

External links

 

2012 establishments in Malaysia
Amusement parks in Johor
Amusement parks opened in 2012
Buildings and structures in Iskandar Puteri
Legoland